Saint-Laurent-de-la-Barrière is a former commune in the Charente-Maritime department in the Nouvelle-Aquitaine region in southwestern France. On 1 January 2018, it was merged into the new commune of La Devise.

Population

See also
Communes of the Charente-Maritime department

References

Former communes of Charente-Maritime
Populated places disestablished in 2018
Charente-Maritime communes articles needing translation from French Wikipedia